Xocomil is a weather phenomenon in Lake Atitlan, Guatemala.

Causes 
Xocomil is created by air pressure or temperature differences between the lake and the surrounding mountains. It usually develops around noon, and it becomes impossible for boats to sail when this phenomenon begins.

Mythology 
One local legend is about a Mayan couple. A Kaqchiquel warrior Utzil ran away with the K'iche' princess Zacar, and were chased by her people. Utzil went to look for help from a caiman to cross the lake, but found the princess dead when he returned. He then took her body and threw himself into the lake. In the afternoons, the couple plays in the lake and the xocomil blows so they can be left alone.

References

Weather hazards
Weather events in South America